Thomas Mackay Cooper, 1st Baron Cooper of Culross  (24 September 1892 – 15 July 1956) was a Scottish Unionist Party politician, a judge and a historian, who had been appointed Lord Advocate of Scotland.

Background and education

Cooper was the son of John Cooper, of Edinburgh, a civil engineer, and Margaret, daughter of John Mackay, of Dunnet, Caithness. In 1915 he applied to George Watson's College, Edinburgh, and the University of Edinburgh where he completed an MA in 1912 and a Law LLB.

Political, legal and judicial career
Cooper was admitted a member of the Faculty of Advocates in 1915 and created a King's Counsel in 1927. He was the Unionist Member of Parliament (MP) for Edinburgh West from a by-election in 1935 to 1941. In 1935 he was appointed Solicitor General for Scotland and later that year he was appointed as Lord Advocate. He also became a Privy Counsellor in 1935. In 1941 he became Lord Justice Clerk with the judicial title of Lord Cooper and in 1947 Lord Justice General and Lord President of the Court of Session.

He resigned in 1954 and was made a peer as Baron Cooper of Culross, of Dunnet in the County of Caithness.

Personal life
Cooper was married to Margaret Mackay.

He was elected a Fellow of the Royal Society of Edinburgh in 1936, his proposers being John Alexander Inglis, Thomas Henry Holland, Thomas Hudson Beare and Ernest Wedderburn. He served as the society's vice president from 1945 to 1948.

Death
Lord Cooper of Culross died in July 1956, aged 62, at which point the barony became extinct. He is buried with his parents near the centre of the SW section of the original Grange Cemetery in south Edinburgh.

See also
 MacCormick v Lord Advocate

References

External links 
 

1892 births
1956 deaths
Alumni of the University of Edinburgh
Lord Advocates
Lords Justice Clerk
Lords Justice-General
Lords President of the Court of Session
Members of the Faculty of Advocates
Members of the Parliament of the United Kingdom for Edinburgh constituencies
Members of the Privy Council of the United Kingdom
Ministers in the Churchill wartime government, 1940–1945
People educated at George Watson's College
20th-century King's Counsel
Scottish King's Counsel
Cooper
Solicitors General for Scotland
UK MPs 1931–1935
UK MPs 1935–1945
UK MPs who were granted peerages
Unionist Party (Scotland) MPs
Ministers in the Chamberlain wartime government, 1939–1940
Ministers in the Chamberlain peacetime government, 1937–1939
Hereditary barons created by Elizabeth II